Huandoy (probably from Quechua wantuy, to transfer, to transpose, to carry, to carry a heavy load) or Tullparaju (possibly from Quechua tullpa rustic cooking-fire, stove, rahu snow, ice, mountain with snow,) is a mountain located inside Huascarán National Park in Ancash, Peru. It is the second-tallest peak of the Cordillera Blanca section of the Andes, after Huascarán. These two peaks are rather nearby, separated only by the Llanganuco glacial valley (which contains the Llanganuco Lakes) at 3,846 m asl.

It is a snow-capped mountain with four peaks arranged in the form of a fireplace, the tallest of which is 6,395 m. The four peaks are each over 6,000 m, and are:
 Huandoy (6,395 m)
 Huandoy-West (6,356 m)
 Huandoy-South (6,160 m)
 Huandoy-East (6,000 m)

It was first climbed in 1932 by a German party.

See also

 List of Ultras of South America

References

External links 
  
 "Huandoy, Peru" on Peakbagger

Mountains of Peru
Mountains of Ancash Region
Six-thousanders of the Andes